Archips fumosus is a species of moth of the family Tortricidae. It is found in Russia, China (Liaoning, Qinghai, Tibet) and Japan.

The wingspan is about 21 mm for males and 27 mm for females.

The larvae feed on Abies nephrolepis, Picea usperata and Taxus species.

References

Moths described in 1960
Archips
Moths of Asia